The Orlando Museum of Art (OMA) is a 501 (c) 3 not-for-profit organization directly serving greater Orlando, Orange County and Central Florida. The museum was founded in 1924 by a group of art enthusiasts. The museum's mission is to inspire creativity, passion and intellectual curiosity by connecting people with art and new ideas.

General 
OMA presents a rotating series of temporary exhibitions originated by the museum matched by traveling shows that are complemented by permanent collection exhibitions and continuous education programs for people of all ages. OMA hosts year-round workshops, art appreciation classes, lectures, seminars, films and guided tours for children and adults.

In 2014, the museum launched the exhibition initiative titled The Florida Prize in Contemporary Art which features work produced by the most progressive and thought-provoking emerging and mid-career artists living and working in the State of Florida today.

OMA is accredited by the American Alliance of Museums (AAM) and is a member of the North American Reciprocal Museums program.

History 
The history of the Orlando Museum of Art (OMA) is one of growth guided by community leadership. OMA was founded in 1924 as Orlando Art Association. Its name was changed to the Loch Haven Art Center in 1960, and again to the Orlando Museum of Art in 1986.

The organization began as a small art center with a group of artists who met informally in the early 1920s, displaying and critiquing their work. In the late 1950s, the community raised funds to build a new facility designed by James Gamble Rogers III, which was completed in 1960.

OMA began to collect art in 1960 when it accepted the donations of important American paintings by Georgia O'Keeffe and Charles Sheeler. OMA continued its expansion, working with architects Nils Schweizer and Duane Stark, both students of Frank Lloyd Wright. By 1969 OMA had added new galleries, a 250-seat auditorium, three studio classrooms, a library, vault and offices.

During the 1970s, OMA was given a major collection of Art of the Ancient Americas, and additional works of African Art, and also formed the nucleus of its acclaimed Contemporary American Graphics Collection.

In 1985, OMA was designated a "major cultural institution" by the State of Florida.

In 1997, OMA completed a $13.5 million facility renovation and building project which expanded the facility to its current size of 80,000 square feet.

In 2022, the Federal Bureau of Investigation (FBI) investigated artwork attributed to Jean-Michel Basquiat in the OMA exhibition Heroes & Monsters. The exhibition, which consisted of 25 paintings on reclaimed cardboard, opened in February 2022 and was originally planned to run through June 2023. After news of the investigation, the exhibition was set to close early on June 30, 2022. On June 24, 2022, the FBI removed the entire exhibition after the works' authenticity was questioned. The paintings were claimed to have been purchased by Thad Mumford directly from Basquiat for $5,000 in 1982 and then placed in storage, where they remained until being rediscovered in 2012. An affidavit obtained by The New York Times revealed that Mumford told a federal agent in 2014 that he "never purchased Basquiat artwork and was unaware of any Basquiat artwork being in his storage locker." He signed an affidavit in 2017, a year before his death, stating that he had never met Basquiat. A few days after the FBI seizure, the board released a statement announcing that De Groft is no longer the Director and CEO of the museum. Joann Walfish, a longtime employee who served as the CFO, was appointed interim COO. The New York Times later reported that the museum's board of trustees that had planned to see the resignation of chair Cynthia Brumback were themselves removed, citing a previously overlooked rule that limited trustees to nine-year terms. Two days later, Brumback resigned and the board of trustees elected Mark Elliot as the museum's new chair.

Collections 
OMA's collection boasts more than 2,400 objects including Contemporary Art, American Art from the 18th century to 1945, Art of the Ancient Americas and African Art. The Art of the Ancient Americas collection is among the finest of its kind in the Southeastern United States.

On May 1, 2018, OMA announced that it may become the permanent home of an extensive collection of the paintings of Belgian Post-Impressionist painter, Louis Dewis. OMA presented a small exhibition of seven Dewis paintings from May 18 through September 9, 2018, as a preview of a major Dewis exhibition presented January 25 through May 5, 2019.

Florida Prize in Contemporary Art Exhibition 
The annual Florida Prize in Contemporary Art has become one of the Orlando Museum of Art’s most anticipated exhibitions, aiming to bring new recognition to the most progressive artists in the State. Each year OMA’s curators survey artists working throughout the State before inviting ten to participate. One artist receives a $20,000 award, underwritten since 2017 by local philanthropists Gail and Michael Winn. 

Artists range from emerging to mid-career, often with distinguished records of exhibitions and awards that reflect recognition at national and international levels. In all cases they are artists who are engaged in exploring significant ideas of art and culture in original and visually exciting ways. As of 2022, the exhibition has brought 80 Florida artists a new level of recognition in the state and beyond.

As a survey exhibition, the Florida Prize always brings together artists of diverse backgrounds and varying practices. It seeks to be a snapshot of the State’s cultural vitality seen through some of the most compelling work being done here and now.

Notes

External links

Orlando Museum of Art (official website)
Orlando Museum of Art. Museum information from Traditional Fines Arts Organization including descriptions of exhibitions
Orlando Museum of Art Orlando, Florida. Museum Info webpage from MuseumUSA.org.

Art museums and galleries in Florida
Museums in Orlando, Florida
Art museums established in 1924
1924 establishments in Florida
Institutions accredited by the American Alliance of Museums